Calamagrostis (reed grass or smallweed) is a genus of flowering plants in the grass family Poaceae, with about 260 species that occur mainly in temperate regions of the globe. Towards equatorial latitudes, species of Calamagrostis generally occur at higher elevations. These tufted perennials usually have hairless narrow leaves. The ligules are usually blunt. The inflorescence forms a panicle. Some may be reed-like.

The plants may be rhizomatous (underground stems with shoots), stoloniferous (with runners), or caespitose (growing in tufts or clumps). The bisexual spikelets have a single floret and generally they are purple or purple-brown. The spikelets are clustered into inflorescences, which usually develop in early- to mid-summer on long culms ( = stems).

Many species of Calamagrostis are morphologically similar, but they generally occur in distinct habitats, and they have unique geographical distributions. Given the subtle distinctions between many closely related taxa, there are several species complexes that could benefit from additional systematic study. Even the generic boundaries of the genus are controversial. For example, species in the genus Deyeuxia, distributed largely in the southern hemisphere are morphologically very similar to species of Calamagrostis. It may be appropriate to recognize all of these species in a single genus, but this will require detailed scientific study of DNA of species from around the world.

Some Calamagrostis can be very decorative, and are widely cultivated largely in northern temperate zones. The species Calamagrostis brachytricha and the cultivar Calamagrostis × acutiflora 'Karl Foerster' are recipients of the Royal Horticultural Society's Award of Garden Merit.

The word "Calamagrostis" is derived from the Greek word kalamos (reed) and agrostis (a kind of grass).

Species 
Calamagrostis contains the following recognised species:

Calamagrostis abnormis (Hook.f.) U.Shukla
Calamagrostis acuminata (Vickery) Govaerts
Calamagrostis × acutiflora (Schrad.) DC.
Calamagrostis affinis (M.Gray) Govaerts
Calamagrostis ajanensis Kharkev. & Prob.
Calamagrostis alajica Litv.
Calamagrostis alba (J.Presl) Steud.
Calamagrostis albiflora Vaniot
Calamagrostis altaica Tzvelev
Calamagrostis amoena (Pilg.) Pilg.
Calamagrostis ampliflora Tovar
Calamagrostis × andrejewii Litv.
Calamagrostis angustifolia Kom.
Calamagrostis anthoxanthoides (Munro) Regel
Calamagrostis appressa (Vickery) Govaerts
Calamagrostis archboldii Hitchc.
Calamagrostis arundinacea (L.) Roth
Calamagrostis atjehensis Ohwi
Calamagrostis aurea (Munro) Hack. ex Sodiro
Calamagrostis australis (Moritzi) Buse
Calamagrostis austrodensa Govaerts
Calamagrostis austroscaberula Govaerts
Calamagrostis autumnalis Koidz.
Calamagrostis avenoides (Hook.f.) Cockayne
Calamagrostis × badzhalensis Prob.
Calamagrostis baicalensis (Litv.) Steph. ex Komarov
Calamagrostis balkharica P.A.Smirn.
Calamagrostis benthamiana (Vickery) Govaerts
Calamagrostis × bihariensis Simonk.
Calamagrostis bogotensis (Pilg.) Pilg.
Calamagrostis bolanderi Thurb.
Calamagrostis boliviensis Hack.
Calamagrostis borii Tzvelev
Calamagrostis boyacensis Swallen & Garc.-Barr.
Calamagrostis brachyathera (Stapf) Govaerts
Calamagrostis brassii Hitchc.
Calamagrostis breviaristata (Wedd.) Pilg.
Calamagrostis brevifolia (J.Presl) Steud.
Calamagrostis breweri Thurb.
Calamagrostis cabrerae Parodi
Calamagrostis cainii Hitchc.
Calamagrostis calderillensis Pilg.
Calamagrostis canadensis (Michx.) P.Beauv.
Calamagrostis canescens (Weber) Roth
Calamagrostis carchiensis Laegaard
Calamagrostis carinata (Vickery) Govaerts
Calamagrostis caucasica Trin.
Calamagrostis cephalantha Pilg.
Calamagrostis chalybaea (Laest.) Fr.
Calamagrostis chaseae Luces
Calamagrostis chilensis Phil.
Calamagrostis chrysantha (J.Presl) Steud.
Calamagrostis chrysophylla (Phil.) Govaerts
Calamagrostis cleefii Escalona
Calamagrostis clipeata Vaniot
Calamagrostis coahuilensis P.M.Peterson, Soreng & Valde´s-Reyna
Calamagrostis coarctata Eaton
Calamagrostis conferta (Keng) P.C.Kuo & S.L.Lu
Calamagrostis × conwentzii Ulbr.
Calamagrostis cordechii Govaerts
Calamagrostis crassiuscula (Vickery) Govaerts
Calamagrostis crispa (Rugolo & Villav.) Govaerts
Calamagrostis cryptolopha (Wedd.) Hitchc.
Calamagrostis curta (Wedd.) Hitchc.
Calamagrostis curtoides (Rugolo & Villav.) Govaerts
Calamagrostis curvula (Wedd.) Pilg.
Calamagrostis cuzcoensis Tovar
Calamagrostis × czerepanovii Husseinov
Calamagrostis debilis Hook.f.
Calamagrostis decipiens (R.Br.) Govaerts
Calamagrostis decora Hook.f.
Calamagrostis densiflora (J.Presl) Steud.
Calamagrostis deschampsiiformis C.E.Hubb.
Calamagrostis deschampsioides Trin.
Calamagrostis deserticola (Phil.) Phil.
Calamagrostis diemii (Rúgolo) Soreng
Calamagrostis diffusa (Keng) Keng f.
Calamagrostis distantifolia Luchnik
Calamagrostis divaricata P.M.Peterson & Soreng
Calamagrostis divergens Swallen
Calamagrostis dmitrievae Tzvelev
Calamagrostis drummondii (Steud.) Govaerts
Calamagrostis ecuadoriensis Laegaard
Calamagrostis effusa (Kunth) Steud.
Calamagrostis effusiflora (Rendle) P.C.Kuo & S.L.Lu ex J.L.Yang
Calamagrostis elatior (Griseb.) A.Camus
Calamagrostis eminens (J.Presl) Steud.
Calamagrostis emodensis Griseb.
Calamagrostis epigejos (L.) Roth
Calamagrostis erectifolia Hitchc.
Calamagrostis eriantha (Kunth) Steud.
Calamagrostis expansa (Munro ex Hillebr.) Hitchc.
Calamagrostis fauriei Hack.
Calamagrostis fibrovaginata Laegaard
Calamagrostis fiebrigii Pilg.
Calamagrostis filifolia Merr.
Calamagrostis filipes (Keng) P.C.Kuo & S.L.Lu ex J.L.Yang
Calamagrostis flaccida Keng f.
Calamagrostis foliosa Kearney
Calamagrostis frigida (Benth.) Maiden & Betche
Calamagrostis fulgida Laegaard
Calamagrostis fulva (Griseb.) Kuntze
Calamagrostis fuscata (J.Presl) Steud.
Calamagrostis gayana (Steud.) Soreng
Calamagrostis gigas Takeda
Calamagrostis glacialis (Wedd.) Hitchc.
Calamagrostis griffithii (Bor) G.Singh
Calamagrostis guamanensis Escalona
Calamagrostis guatemalensis Hitchc.
Calamagrostis gunniana (Nees) Reeder
Calamagrostis hackelii Lillo ex Stuck.
Calamagrostis hakonensis Franch. & Sav.
Calamagrostis × hartmaniana Fr.
Calamagrostis × haussknechtiana Torges
Calamagrostis hedbergii Melderis
Calamagrostis henryi (Rendle) P.C.Kuo & S.L.Lu ex J.L.Yang
Calamagrostis heterophylla (Wedd.) Pilg.
Calamagrostis hieronymi Hack.
Calamagrostis hillebrandii (Munro ex Hillebr.) C.L.Hitchc.
Calamagrostis hirta (Sodiro ex Mille) Laegaard
Calamagrostis holciformis Jaub. & Spach
Calamagrostis holmii Lange
Calamagrostis howellii Vasey
Calamagrostis hupehensis (Rendle) Chase
Calamagrostis imbricata (Vickery) Govaerts
Calamagrostis inaequalis (Vickery) Govaerts
Calamagrostis inexpansa A.Gray
Calamagrostis insperata Swallen
Calamagrostis intermedia (J.Presl) Steud.
Calamagrostis involuta Swallen
Calamagrostis jamesonii Steud.
Calamagrostis kalarica Tzvelev
Calamagrostis kengii T.F.Wang
Calamagrostis killipii Swallen
Calamagrostis koelerioides Vasey
Calamagrostis kokonorica Keng ex Tzvelev
Calamagrostis korotkyi Litv.
Calamagrostis korshinskyi Litv.
Calamagrostis × kotulae Zapal.
Calamagrostis × kuznetzovii Tzvelev
Calamagrostis lahulensis G.Singh
Calamagrostis lapponica (Wahlenb.) Hartm.
Calamagrostis lawrencei (Vickery) Govaerts
Calamagrostis leiophylla (Wedd.) Hitchc.
Calamagrostis leonardii Chase
Calamagrostis levipes (Keng) P.C.Kuo & S.L.Lu ex J.L.Yang
Calamagrostis licentiana Hand.-Mazz.
Calamagrostis ligulata (Kunth) Hitchc.
Calamagrostis linifolia Govaerts
Calamagrostis llanganatensis Laegaard
Calamagrostis longiseta Hack.
Calamagrostis macbridei Tovar
Calamagrostis macilenta (Griseb.) Litv.
Calamagrostis macrophylla (Pilg.) Pilg.
Calamagrostis malamalensis Hack. ex Stuck.
Calamagrostis mandoniana (Wedd.) Pilg.
Calamagrostis matsumurae Maxim.
Calamagrostis mckiei (Vickery) Govaerts
Calamagrostis menhoferi Govaerts
Calamagrostis mesathera (Vickery) Govaerts
Calamagrostis microseta (Vickery) Govaerts
Calamagrostis minarovii Hüseyin
Calamagrostis minima (Pilg.) Tovar
Calamagrostis minor (Benth.) J.M.Black
Calamagrostis mollis Pilg.
Calamagrostis montanensis (Scribn.) Scribn. ex Vasey
Calamagrostis moupinensis Franch.
Calamagrostis muiriana B.L.Wilson & Sami Gray
Calamagrostis mulleri Luces
Calamagrostis munroi Boiss.
Calamagrostis nagarum (Bor) G.Singh
Calamagrostis nardifolia (Griseb.) Hack. ex Stuck.
Calamagrostis neesii Steud.
Calamagrostis neocontracta Govaerts
Calamagrostis niitakayamensis Honda
Calamagrostis ningxiaensis D.Z.Ma & J.N.Li
Calamagrostis nitidula Pilg.
Calamagrostis nivicola (Hook.f.) Hand.-Mazz.
Calamagrostis nudiflora (Vickery) Govaerts
Calamagrostis nutkaensis (J.Presl) Steud.
Calamagrostis obtusata Trin.
Calamagrostis ophitidis (Howell) Nygren
Calamagrostis orbignyana (Wedd.) Pilg.
Calamagrostis orizabae (Rupr. ex E.Fourn.) Beal
Calamagrostis ovata (J.Presl) Steud.
Calamagrostis × paradoxa Lipsky
Calamagrostis parsana (Bor) M.Dogan
Calamagrostis parviseta (Vickery) Reeder
Calamagrostis patagonica (Speg.) Makloskie
Calamagrostis pavlovii (Roshev.) Roshev.
Calamagrostis perplexa Scribn.
Calamagrostis petelotii (Hitchc.) Govaerts
Calamagrostis pickeringii A.Gray
Calamagrostis pinetorum Swallen
Calamagrostis pisinna Swallen
Calamagrostis pittieri Hack.
Calamagrostis planifolia (Kunth) Trin. ex Steud.
Calamagrostis poluninii T.J.Sørensen
Calamagrostis polycephala Vaniot
Calamagrostis polygama (Griseb.) Parodi
Calamagrostis × ponojensis Montell
Calamagrostis porteri A.Gray
Calamagrostis × prahliana Torges
Calamagrostis preslii (Kunth) Hitchc.
Calamagrostis pringlei Beal
Calamagrostis przevalskyi Tzvelev
Calamagrostis × pseudodeschampsioides Tzvelev
Calamagrostis pseudophragmites (Haller f.) Koeler
Calamagrostis pungens Tovar
Calamagrostis purpurascens R.Br.
Calamagrostis purpurea (Trin.) Trin.
Calamagrostis pusilla Reeder
Calamagrostis quadriseta (Labill.) Spreng.
Calamagrostis radicans Vaniot
Calamagrostis ramonae Escalona
Calamagrostis rauhii Tovar
Calamagrostis recta (Kunth) Trin. ex Steud.
Calamagrostis reflexa (Vickery) Govaerts
Calamagrostis reitzii Swallen
Calamagrostis × rigens Lindgr.
Calamagrostis rigescens (J.Presl) Scribn.
Calamagrostis rigida (Kunth) Trin. ex Steud.
Calamagrostis rodwayi (Vickery) Govaerts
Calamagrostis rosea (Griseb.) Hack.
Calamagrostis rubescens Buckley
Calamagrostis rupestris Trin.
Calamagrostis sachalinensis F.Schmidt
Calamagrostis sajanensis Malyschev
Calamagrostis salina Tzvelev
Calamagrostis scaberula Swallen
Calamagrostis scabrescens Griseb.
Calamagrostis scabriflora Swallen
Calamagrostis sclerantha Hack.
Calamagrostis sclerophylla (Stapf) Hitchc.
Calamagrostis scopulorum M.E.Jones
Calamagrostis scotica (Druce) Druce
Calamagrostis sesquiflora (Trin.) Tzvelev
Calamagrostis setiflora (Wedd.) Pilg.
Calamagrostis sichuanensis J.L.Yang
Calamagrostis sikangensis (Keng) P.C.Kuo & S.L.Lu ex J.L.Yang
Calamagrostis sinelatior (Keng) P.C.Kuo & S.L.Lu ex J.L.Yang
Calamagrostis smirnowii Litv. ex Petrov
Calamagrostis spicigera (J.Presl) Steud.
Calamagrostis spruceana (Wedd.) Hack. ex Sodiro
Calamagrostis srilankensis Davidse
Calamagrostis staintonii G.Singh
Calamagrostis stenophylla Hand.-Mazz.
Calamagrostis steyermarkii Swallen
Calamagrostis stolizkai Hook.f.
Calamagrostis stricta (Timm) Koeler
[[Calamagrostis × strigosa|Calamagrostis' × strigosa]] (Wahlenb.) Hartm.Calamagrostis subacrochaeta Nakai
Calamagrostis × subchalybaea Tzvelev
Calamagrostis × subepigeios TzvelevCalamagrostis sublanceolata Honda
Calamagrostis × submonticola Prob.
Calamagrostis × subneglecta TzvelevCalamagrostis suka Speg.Calamagrostis tacomensis K.L.Marr & HebdaCalamagrostis tarmensis Pilg.Calamagrostis tashiroi Ohwi
Calamagrostis × tatianae Prob.Calamagrostis teberdensis Litv.Calamagrostis teretifolia LaegaardCalamagrostis tianschanica Rupr.Calamagrostis tibetica (Bor) TzvelevCalamagrostis tolucensis (Kunth) Trin. ex Steud.
Calamagrostis × torgesiana Hausskn.Calamagrostis trichodonta (Wedd.) SorengCalamagrostis turkestanica Hack.Calamagrostis tweedyi (Scribn.) Scribn.Calamagrostis tzvelevii Hüseyin
Calamagrostis × uralensis Litv.
Calamagrostis × ussuriensis TzvelevCalamagrostis valida SohnsCalamagrostis varia (Schrad.) Host
Calamagrostis × vassiljevii TzvelevCalamagrostis velutina (Nees & Meyen) Steud.Calamagrostis veresczaginii Zolot.Calamagrostis vicunarum (Wedd.) Pilg.Calamagrostis villosa (Chaix) J.F.Gmel.
Calamagrostis × vilnensis BesserCalamagrostis violacea (Wedd.) Hack.Calamagrostis viridiflavescens (Poir.) Steud.Calamagrostis viridis (Phil.) SorengCalamagrostis vulcanica SwallenCalamagrostis yanyuanensis J.L.Yang
Calamagrostis × yatabei Maxim.Calamagrostis youngii (Hook.f.) BuchananCalamagrostis zenkeri'' (Trin.) Davidse
Calamagrostis × zerninensis Lüderw.

References

External links

Grass Genera of the World
 Interactive Key to Calamagrostis of North America

 
Poaceae genera